Caligula (31 August 12 – 24 January 41), formally known as Gaius (Gaius Caesar Augustus Germanicus), was the third Roman emperor, ruling from AD 37 until his assassination in AD 41. He was the son of the Roman general Germanicus and Agrippina the Elder, Augustus' granddaughter. Caligula was born into the first ruling family of the Roman Empire, conventionally known as the Julio-Claudian dynasty.

Although Gaius was named after Gaius Julius Caesar, he acquired the nickname "Caligula" ("little caliga", a type of military boot) from his father's soldiers during their campaign in Germania. When Germanicus died at Antioch in 19, Agrippina returned with her six children to Rome, where she became entangled in a bitter feud with Tiberius. The conflict eventually led to the destruction of her family, with Caligula as the sole male survivor. In 26, Tiberius withdrew from public life to the island of Capri, and in 31, Caligula joined him there. Following the former's death in 37, Caligula succeeded him as emperor. There are few surviving sources about the reign of Caligula, though he is described as a noble and moderate emperor during the first six months of his rule. After this, the sources focus upon his cruelty, sadism, extravagance, and sexual perversion, presenting him as an insane tyrant. 

While the reliability of these sources is questionable, it is known that during his brief reign, Caligula worked to increase the unconstrained personal power of the emperor, as opposed to countervailing powers within the principate. He directed much of his attention to ambitious construction projects and luxurious dwellings for himself, and he initiated the construction of two aqueducts in Rome: the Aqua Claudia and the Anio Novus. During his reign, the empire annexed the client kingdom of Mauretania as a province. In early 41, Caligula was assassinated as a result of a conspiracy by officers of the Praetorian Guard, senators, and courtiers. However, the conspirators' attempt to use the opportunity to restore the Roman Republic was thwarted. On the day of the assassination of Caligula, the Praetorians declared Caligula's uncle, Claudius, as the next emperor. Caligula's death marked the official end of the Julii Caesares in the male line, though the Julio-Claudian dynasty continued to rule until the demise of his nephew, Nero.

Early life 

Caligula was born in Antium on 31 August 12 CE, the third of six surviving children born to Germanicus, a grandson of Mark Antony, and his second cousin Agrippina the Elder, who was the daughter of Marcus Vipsanius Agrippa and Julia the Elder, making her the granddaughter of Augustus. He was also a nephew of Claudius, Germanicus' younger brother and the future emperor. He had two older brothers, Nero and Drusus, and three younger sisters, Agrippina the Younger, Julia Drusilla and Julia Livilla. At the age of two or three, he accompanied his father, Germanicus, on campaigns in the north of Germania. He wore a miniature soldier's outfit, including army boots (caligae) and armour. The soldiers thus nicknamed him Caligula ("little [soldier's] boot"). He reportedly grew to dislike the nickname.

Germanicus died at Antioch, Syria province, in AD 19, aged only 33. Suetonius claims that Germanicus was poisoned by an agent of Tiberius, who viewed Germanicus as a political rival. After the death of his father, Caligula lived with his mother, Agripinna the Elder, until her relations with Tiberius deteriorated. Tiberius would not allow Agrippina to remarry for fear her husband would be a rival. Agrippina and Caligula's brother, Nero, were banished in the year 29 CE on charges of treason. The adolescent Caligula was sent to live with his great-grandmother (Tiberius' mother), Livia; After her death, he was sent to live with his grandmother Antonia Minor. In the year 30 CE, his brother Drusus was imprisoned on charges of treason, and his brother Nero died in exile from either starvation or suicide. Suetonius writes that after the banishment of his mother and brothers, Caligula and his sisters were nothing more than prisoners of Tiberius under the close watch of soldiers. In the year 31, Caligula was remanded to the personal care of Tiberius on Capri, where he lived for six years. To the surprise of many, Caligula was spared by Tiberius. Roman historians describe Caligula as an excellent natural actor who recognized the danger he was in, and hid his resentment towards Tiberius. An observer said of Caligula, "Never was there a better servant or a worse master!"

Caligula claimed to have planned to kill Tiberius with a dagger to avenge his mother and brother: however, having brought the weapon into Tiberius' bedroom he did not kill the Emperor but instead threw the dagger down on the floor. Supposedly Tiberius knew of this plot but did nothing about it. Suetonius claims that Caligula was by this time already cruel and vicious: he writes that when Tiberius brought Caligula to the island of Capri, his purpose was to allow Caligula to live in order that he "prove the ruin of himself and of all men, and that he was rearing a viper for the Roman people and a Phaethon for the world." In 33, Tiberius gave Caligula an honorary quaestorship, a position he held until his rise to emperor. Meanwhile, both Caligula's mother and his brother Drusus died in prison. Caligula was briefly married to Junia Claudilla in the year 33, though she died in childbirth the following year. Caligula spent time befriending the Praetorian prefect, Naevius Sutorius Macro, an important ally. Macro spoke well of Caligula to Tiberius, attempting to quell any ill will or suspicion the Emperor felt towards Caligula. In the year 35, Caligula was named joint heir to Tiberius' estate along with Tiberius Gemellus.

Emperor

Early reign 

Tiberius died on 16 March AD 37. The next day would have been the Liberalia, one of the days on which Gemellus could have been bestowed the toga virilis. Rumours inevitably circulated that Caligula, possibly assisted by Macro, smothered Tiberius with a pillow, recorded in sources Suetonius and Tacitus. However, Seneca the Elder and Philo, who both wrote during Tiberius' reign, as well as Josephus, record Tiberius as dying a natural death. Regardless, on the death of Tiberius, Gemellus was still a child. Caligula assumed the leadership of the domus Caesaris and this was ratified by the senate, which acclaimed him emperor, two days later on 18 March. Ten days later, Tiberius' will, naming two heirs, was nullified with the standard justification that he had been insane.

Caligula is described as the first emperor who was admired by everyone in "all the world, from the rising to the setting sun." Caligula was loved by many for being the beloved son of the popular Germanicus and because he was not Tiberius. Suetonius said that over 160,000 animals were sacrificed during three months of public rejoicing to usher in the new reign. Philo describes the first seven months of Caligula's reign as completely blissful. 

Caligula's first acts were said to be generous in spirit, though many were political in nature. Overriding Tiberius' will, which left a legacy of 500 sesterces to each praetorian, he instead doubled it; further bonuses were granted to the city troops and the army outside Italy.  Coinage indicates that donatives to the praetorians may have been repeated through Caligula's reign. A further distribution of 75 sesterces per citizen in Rome was given from 1 June to 19 July; Caligula wasted no time putting on lavish games, immediately requesting from the senate exemption from sumptuary laws limiting the number of gladiators. He also transferred the right to elect praetors back to the comitia, which meant in practice that aediles had incentives to spend money to put on lavish spectacles to win popularity. Building projects on the Palatine hill and elsewhere also were announced, which would have been the largest of these expenditures.

Caligula also took action to win the support of the aristocracy. He made a public show of burning Tiberius' secret papers, falsely claiming that he had not read them. On coinage, he advertised that he had restored the rule of law; to that end, he lifted a backlog on court cases in Rome by adding more jurors and lifting the need for imperial confirmation of sentences. Refusing the title pater patriae on the grounds of his youth, he also recalled those who had been sent into exile. Stressing his descent from Augustus, he went in person to retrieve the remains of his mother and brothers for internment in the Mausoleum of Augustus. His sisters and other family members, including Claudius – who had not been a member of the imperial household during Tiberius' reign – were granted political and priestly honours. Work on a temple to Livia, vowed but never constructed, also began.

Those whom Tiberius alone had supported lost out. Gemellus was required to kill himself on charges of having taken an antidote, "ie implicitly accusing Caligula of wanting to poison him". Tiberius' political associate Marcus Junius Silanus, a support of Gemellus, was executed; Caligula's friend Macro also was killed. These purges suggest "the new emperor had learnt a great deal from Tiberius" and "that attempts to divide his reign into a 'good' beginning followed by unremitting atrocities... are misplaced". This division into good and bad phases has variously been attributed to the death of Antonia in summer 37, illness in autumn that year, or otherwise the death of Caligula's allegedly beloved sister Drusilla on 10 June AD 38.

During his illness in AD 37 and after Gemellus' death, Caligula entrusted his brother-in-law, Marcus Aemilius Lepidus as heir, marrying him to his sister Drusilla. The ancient sources allege he and Lepidus were homosexual lovers. After Drusilla's death in June AD 38, she was deified in September the same year.

Public reform and financial crisis 

In the year 38, Caligula focused his attention on political and public reform. He published the accounts of public funds, which had not been made public during the reign of Tiberius. He aided those who lost property in fires, abolished certain taxes, and gave out prizes to the public at gymnastic events. He allowed new members into the equestrian and senatorial orders. Perhaps most significantly, he restored the practice of elections. Cassius Dio said that this act "though delighting the rabble, grieved the sensible, who stopped to reflect, that if the offices should fall once more into the hands of the many... many disasters would result". During the same year, though, Caligula was criticized for executing people without full trials and for forcing the Praetorian prefect, Macro, to commit suicide.

According to Cassius Dio, a financial crisis emerged in 39. Suetonius places the beginning of this crisis in 38. Caligula's political payments for support, generosity and extravagance had exhausted the state's treasury. Ancient historians state that Caligula began falsely accusing, fining and even killing individuals for the purpose of seizing their estates. Historians describe a number of Caligula's other desperate measures. To gain funds, Caligula asked the public to lend the state money. He levied taxes on lawsuits, weddings and prostitution. Caligula began auctioning the lives of the gladiators at shows. Wills that left items to Tiberius were reinterpreted to leave the items instead to Caligula. Centurions who had acquired property by plunder were forced to turn over spoils to the state. The current and past highway commissioners were accused of incompetence and embezzlement and forced to repay money.

According to Suetonius, in the first year of Caligula's reign he squandered 2.7 billion sesterces that Tiberius had amassed. His nephew Nero both envied and admired the fact that Gaius had run through the vast wealth Tiberius had left him in so short a time. However, some historians have shown scepticism towards the large number of sesterces quoted by Suetonius and Dio. According to Wilkinson, Caligula's use of precious metals to mint coins throughout his principate indicates that the treasury most likely never fell into bankruptcy. He does point out, however, that it is difficult to ascertain whether the purported 'squandered wealth' was from the treasury alone due to the blurring of "the division between the private wealth of the emperor and his income as head of state." Furthermore, Alston points out that Caligula's successor, Claudius, was able to donate 15,000 sesterces to each member of the Praetorian Guard in 41, suggesting the Roman treasury was solvent. A brief famine of unknown extent occurred, perhaps caused by this financial crisis, but Suetonius claims it resulted from Caligula's seizure of public carriages; according to Seneca, grain imports were disrupted because Caligula re-purposed grain boats for a pontoon bridge.

Construction and senatorial feud 

Despite financial difficulties, Caligula embarked on a number of construction projects during his reign. Some were for the public good, though others were for himself. Josephus describes Caligula's improvements to the harbours at Rhegium and Sicily, allowing increased grain imports from Egypt, as his greatest contributions. These improvements may have been in response to the famine. Caligula completed the temple of Augustus and the theatre of Pompey and began an amphitheatre beside the Saepta. He also expanded the imperial palace. Later, he began the construction of aqueducts Aqua Claudia and Anio Novus, which Pliny the Elder considered to be engineering marvels. Caligula then built a large racetrack known as the circus of Gaius and Nero and had an Egyptian obelisk (now known as the "Vatican Obelisk") that was transported by sea and erected in the middle of Rome.

At Syracuse, he repaired the city walls and the temples of the gods. He had new roads built and pushed to keep roads in good condition. Caligula had planned to rebuild the palace of Polycrates at Samos, to finish the temple of Didymaean Apollo at Ephesus and to found a city high up in the Alps. He also intended to dig a canal through the Isthmus of Corinth in Greece and sent a chief centurion to survey the work. In 39, Caligula performed a spectacular stunt by ordering a temporary floating bridge to be built using ships as pontoons, stretching for over two miles from the resort of Baiae to the neighbouring port of Puteoli. It was said that the bridge was to rival the Persian king Xerxes' pontoon bridge crossing of the Hellespont. Caligula, who could not swim, then proceeded to ride his favourite horse Incitatus across, wearing the breastplate of Alexander the Great. This act was in defiance of a prediction by Tiberius' soothsayer Thrasyllus of Mendes that Caligula had "no more chance of becoming emperor than of riding a horse across the Bay of Baiae".

Caligula had two large ships constructed for himself (which were recovered from the bottom of Lake Nemi around 1930). The ships were among the largest vessels in the ancient world. The smaller ship was designed as a temple dedicated to Diana. The larger ship was essentially an elaborate floating palace with marble floors and plumbing. The ships burned in 1944 after an attack in the Second World War; almost nothing remains of their hulls, though many archaeological treasures remain intact in the museum at Lake Nemi and in the Museo Nazionale Romano (Palazzo Massimo) at Rome. 

In 39, relations between Caligula and the Roman Senate deteriorated. The subject of their disagreement is unknown. A number of factors, though, aggravated this feud. The Senate had become accustomed to ruling without an emperor between the departure of Tiberius for Capri in 26 and Caligula's accession. Additionally, Tiberius' treason trials had eliminated a number of pro-Julian senators such as Asinius Gallus. Caligula reviewed Tiberius' records of treason trials and decided, based on their actions during these trials, that numerous senators were not trustworthy. He ordered a new set of investigations and trials. He replaced the consul and had several senators put to death. Suetonius reports that other senators were degraded by being forced to wait on him and run beside his chariot. Soon after his break with the Senate, Caligula faced a number of additional conspiracies against him. That autumn, he claimed to have uncovered a conspiracy to replace him with his then-heir Lepidus. Publicising the failure of the sitting consuls to offer prayers on his birthday – 31 August – he gave orders to concentrate military forces in upper Germany. The governor there, Gnaeus Cornelius Lentulus Gaetulicus was possibly a threat and after Caligula's personal arrival there, was executed. Lepidus, Agrippina, and Livilla, were accused to being part of this conspiracy: Lepidus was executed and the two sisters were exiled after being condemned pro forma of adultery.

Western expansion 

In 40, Caligula expanded the Roman Empire into Mauretania, a client kingdom of Rome ruled by Ptolemy of Mauretania. Caligula invited Ptolemy to Rome and then suddenly had him executed. Mauretania was annexed by Caligula and subsequently divided into two provinces, Mauretania Tingitana and Mauretania Caesariensis, separated by the river Malua. Pliny claims that division was the work of Caligula, but Dio states that in 42 an uprising took place, which was subdued by Gaius Suetonius Paulinus and Gnaeus Hosidius Geta, and the division only took place after this. This confusion might mean that Caligula decided to divide the province, but the division was postponed because of the rebellion. The first known equestrian governor of the two provinces was Marcus Fadius Celer Flavianus, in office in 44.

Details on the Mauretanian events of 39–44 are unclear. Cassius Dio wrote an entire chapter on the annexation of Mauretania by Caligula, but it is now lost. Caligula's move seemingly had a strictly personal political motive – fear and jealousy of his cousin Ptolemy – and thus the expansion may not have been prompted by pressing military or economic needs. However, the rebellion of Tacfarinas had shown how exposed Africa Proconsularis was to its west and how the Mauretanian client kings were unable to provide protection to the province, and it is thus possible that Caligula's expansion was a prudent response to potential future threats.

Caligula brought up abortive attempts to extend Roman rule into Britannia. Two legions had been raised for this purpose (both were likely named Primigeniae in honour of Caligula's newborn daughter). Ancient sources depict Caligula as being too cowardly to have attacked or otherwise was mad, but stories of his threatening decimation indicates mutinies. Broadly, "it is impossible to judge why the army never embarked" on the invasion. Beyond mutinies, it may have simply been that British chieftains acceded to Rome's demands, removing any justification for war. Alternatively, it could have been merely a training and scouting mission or a short expedition to accept the surrender of the British chieftain Adminius. The conquest of Britannia was later achieved during the reign of his successor, Claudius.

Claims of divinity 

When several client kings came to Rome to pay their respects to him and argued about their nobility of descent, he allegedly cried out the Homeric line: "Let there be one lord, one king." In 40, Caligula began implementing very controversial policies that introduced religion into his political role. Caligula began appearing in public dressed as various gods and demigods such as Hercules, Mercury, Venus and Apollo. Reportedly, he began referring to himself as a god when meeting with politicians and he was referred to as "Jupiter" on occasion in public documents. A sacred precinct was set apart for his worship at Miletus in the province of Asia and two temples were erected for worship of him in Rome. The Temple of Castor and Pollux on the forum was linked directly to the imperial residence on the Palatine and dedicated to Caligula.

He would appear there on occasion and present himself as a god to the public. Caligula had the heads removed from various statues of gods located across Rome and replaced them with his own. It is said that he wished to be worshipped as Neos Helios, the "New Sun". Indeed, he was represented as a sun god on Egyptian coins. Caligula's religious policy was a departure from that of his predecessors. According to Cassius Dio, living emperors could be worshipped as divine in the east and dead emperors could be worshipped as divine in Rome. Augustus had the public worship his spirit on occasion, but Dio describes this as an extreme act that emperors generally shied away from. Caligula took things a step further and had those in Rome, including senators, worship him as a tangible, living god.

Eastern policy 

Caligula needed to quell several riots and conspiracies in the eastern territories during his reign. Aiding him in his actions was his good friend, Herod Agrippa, who became governor of the territories of Batanaea and Trachonitis after Caligula became emperor in 37. The cause of tensions in the east was complicated, involving the spread of Greek culture, Roman law and the rights of Jews in the empire. Caligula did not trust the prefect of Egypt, Aulus Avilius Flaccus. Flaccus had been loyal to Tiberius, had conspired against Caligula's mother and had connections with Egyptian separatists. In 38, Caligula sent Agrippa to Alexandria unannounced to check on Flaccus. According to Philo, the visit was met with jeers from the Greek population who saw Agrippa as the king of the Jews. As a result, riots broke out in the city. Caligula responded by removing Flaccus from his position and executing him.

In 39, Agrippa accused his uncle Herod Antipas, the tetrarch of Galilee and Perea, of planning a rebellion against Roman rule with the help of Parthia. Herod Antipas confessed and Caligula exiled him. Agrippa was rewarded with his territories. Riots again erupted in Alexandria in 40 between Jews and Greeks. Jews were accused of not honouring the emperor. Disputes occurred in the city of Jamnia. Jews were angered by the erection of a clay altar and destroyed it. In response, Caligula ordered the erection of a statue of himself in the Jewish Temple of Jerusalem, a demand in conflict with Jewish monotheism. In this context, Philo wrote that Caligula "regarded the Jews with most especial suspicion, as if they were the only persons who cherished wishes opposed to his".

The Governor of Syria, Publius Petronius, fearing civil war if the order were carried out, delayed implementing it for nearly a year. Agrippa finally convinced Caligula to reverse the order. However, Caligula issued a second order to have his statue erected in the Temple of Jerusalem. In Rome, another statue of himself, of colossal size, was made of gilt brass for the purpose. However, according to Josephus, when the ship carrying the statue was still underway, news of Caligula's death reached Petronius. Thus, the statue was never installed.

Scandals 

Philo of Alexandria and Seneca the Younger, contemporaries of Caligula, describe him as an insane emperor who was self-absorbed and short-tempered, killed on a whim, and indulged in too much spending and sex. He is accused of sleeping with other men's wives and bragging about it, killing for mere amusement, deliberately wasting money on his bridge, causing starvation, and wanting a statue of himself in the Temple of Jerusalem for his worship. Once, at some games at which he was presiding, he was said to have ordered his guards to throw an entire section of the audience into the arena during the intermission to be eaten by the wild beasts because there were no prisoners to be used and he was bored.

While repeating the earlier stories, the later sources of Suetonius and Cassius Dio provide additional tales of insanity. They accuse Caligula of incest with his sisters, Agrippina the Younger, Drusilla, and Livilla, and say he prostituted them to other men. Additionally, they mention affairs with various men including his brother-in-law Marcus Lepidus. They state he sent troops on illogical military exercises, turned the palace into a brothel, and, most famously, planned or promised to make his horse, Incitatus, a consul,
and appointed a priest to serve him. The validity of these accounts is debatable. In Roman political culture, insanity and sexual perversity were often presented hand-in-hand with poor government.

Assassination and aftermath 

Caligula's actions as emperor were described as being especially harsh to the Senate, to the nobility and to the equestrian order. According to Josephus, these actions led to several failed conspiracies against Caligula. Eventually, officers within the Praetorian Guard led by Cassius Chaerea succeeded in murdering the emperor. The plot is described as having been planned by three men, but many in the Senate, army and equestrian order were said to have been informed of it and involved in it. The situation had escalated when, in 40, Caligula announced to the Senate that he planned to leave Rome permanently and to move to Alexandria in Egypt, where he hoped to be worshipped as a living god. The prospect of Rome losing its emperor and thus its political power was the final straw for many. Such a move would have left both the Senate and the Praetorian Guard powerless to stop Caligula's repression and debauchery. With this in mind Chaerea persuaded his fellow conspirators, who included Marcus Vinicius and Lucius Annius Vinicianus, to put their plot into action quickly.

According to Josephus, Chaerea had political motivations for the assassination. Suetonius sees the motive in Caligula calling Chaerea derogatory names. Caligula considered Chaerea effeminate because of a weak voice and for not being firm with tax collection. Caligula would mock Chaerea with names like "Priapus" and "Venus". On 24 January 41, Cassius Chaerea and other guardsmen accosted Caligula as he addressed an acting troupe of young men beneath the palace, during a series of games and dramatics being held for the Divine Augustus. Details recorded on the events vary somewhat from source to source, but they agree that Chaerea stabbed Caligula first, followed by a number of conspirators. Suetonius records that Caligula's death resembled that of Julius Caesar. He states that both the elder Gaius Julius Caesar (Julius Caesar) and the younger Gaius Julius Caesar (Caligula) were stabbed 30 times by conspirators led by a man named Cassius (Cassius Longinus and Cassius Chaerea respectively). By the time Caligula's loyal Germanic guard responded, the Emperor was already dead. The Germanic guard killed several assassins and conspirators, along with some innocent senators and bystanders. These wounded conspirators were treated by the physician Arcyon.

The cryptoporticus (underground corridor) beneath the imperial palaces on the Palatine Hill where this event took place was discovered by archaeologists in 2008. The Senate attempted to use Caligula's death as an opportunity to restore the Republic. Chaerea tried to persuade the military to support the Senate. The military, though, remained loyal to the idea of imperial monarchy. Uncomfortable with lingering imperial support, the assassins sought out and killed Caligula's wife, Caesonia, and killed their young daughter, Julia Drusilla, by smashing her head against a wall. They were unable to reach Caligula's uncle, Claudius. After a soldier, Gratus, found Claudius hiding behind a palace curtain, he was spirited out of the city by a sympathetic faction of the Praetorian Guard to their nearby camp. Claudius became emperor after procuring the support of the Praetorian Guard.  Claudius granted a general amnesty, although he executed a few junior officers involved in the conspiracy, including Chaerea.
According to Suetonius, Caligula's body was placed under turf until it was burned and entombed by his sisters. He was buried within the Mausoleum of Augustus; in 410, during the Sack of Rome, the ashes in the tomb were scattered.

Legacy

Historiography 

The facts and circumstances of Caligula's reign are mostly lost to history. Only two sources contemporary with Caligula have survived – the works of Philo and Seneca. Philo's works, On the Embassy to Gaius and Flaccus, give some details on Caligula's early reign, but mostly focus on events surrounding the Jewish population in Judea and Egypt with whom he sympathizes. Seneca's various works give mostly scattered anecdotes on Caligula's personality. Seneca was almost put to death by Caligula in AD 39 likely due to his associations with conspirators. At one time, there were detailed contemporaneous histories on Caligula, but they are now lost. Additionally, the historians who wrote them are described as biased, either overly critical or praising of Caligula. Nonetheless, these lost primary sources, along with the works of Seneca and Philo, were the basis of surviving secondary and tertiary histories on Caligula written by the next generations of historians. A few of the contemporaneous historians are known by name. Fabius Rusticus and Cluvius Rufus both wrote condemning histories on Caligula that are now lost. Fabius Rusticus was a friend of Seneca who was known for historical embellishment and misrepresentation. Cluvius Rufus was a senator involved in the assassination of Caligula.

Caligula's sister, Agrippina the Younger, wrote an autobiography that certainly included a detailed explanation of Caligula's reign, but it too is lost. Agrippina was banished by Caligula for her connection to Marcus Lepidus, who conspired against him. The inheritance of Nero, Agrippina's son and the future emperor, was seized by Caligula. Gaetulicus, a poet, produced a number of flattering writings about Caligula, but they are lost. The bulk of what is known of Caligula comes from Suetonius and Cassius Dio. Suetonius wrote his history on Caligula 80 years after his death, while Cassius Dio wrote his history over 180 years after Caligula's death. Cassius Dio's work is invaluable because it alone gives a loose chronology of Caligula's reign. A handful of other sources add a limited perspective on Caligula. Josephus gives a detailed description of Caligula's assassination. Tacitus provides some information on Caligula's life under Tiberius. In a now lost portion of his Annals, Tacitus gave a detailed history of Caligula. Pliny the Elder's Natural History has a few brief references to Caligula. There are few surviving sources on Caligula and none of them paints Caligula in a favourable light. The paucity of sources has resulted in significant gaps in modern knowledge of the reign of Caligula. Little is written on the first two years of Caligula's reign. Additionally, there are only limited details on later significant events, such as the annexation of Mauretania, Caligula's military actions in Britannia, and his feud with the Roman Senate. According to legend, during his military actions in Britannia Caligula grew addicted to a steady diet of European sea eels, which led to their Latin name being Coluber caligulensis.

Health 

All surviving sources, except Pliny the Elder, characterize Caligula as insane. However, it is not known whether they are speaking figuratively or literally. Additionally, given Caligula's unpopularity among the surviving sources, it is difficult to separate fact from fiction. Recent sources are divided in attempting to ascribe a medical reason for his behavior, citing as possibilities encephalitis, epilepsy or meningitis. The question of whether Caligula was insane (especially after his illness early in his reign) remains unanswered. Philo of Alexandria, Josephus and Seneca state that Caligula was insane, but describe this madness as a personality trait that came through experience. Seneca states that Caligula became arrogant, angry and insulting once he became emperor and uses his personality flaws as examples his readers can learn from. According to Josephus, power made Caligula incredibly conceited and led him to think he was a god. Philo of Alexandria reports that Caligula became ruthless after nearly dying of an illness in the eighth month of his reign in 37. Juvenal reports he was given a magic potion that drove him insane.

Suetonius said that Caligula had "falling sickness", or epilepsy, when he was young. Modern historians have theorized that Caligula lived with a daily fear of seizures. Despite swimming being a part of imperial education, Caligula could not swim. Epileptics are discouraged from swimming in open waters because unexpected fits can lead to death if timely rescue is difficult. Caligula reportedly talked to the full moon: Epilepsy was long associated with the moon.

Suetonius described Caligula as sickly-looking, skinny and pale: "he was tall, very pale, ill-shaped, his neck and legs very slender, his eyes and temples hollow, his brows broad and knit, his hair thin, and the crown of the head bald. The other parts of his body were much covered with hair ... He was crazy both in body and mind, being subject, when a boy, to the falling sickness. When he arrived at the age of manhood he endured fatigue tolerably well. Occasionally he was liable to faintness, during which he remained incapable of any effort". Based on scientific reconstructions of his official painted busts, Caligula had brown hair, brown eyes, and fair skin. Some modern historians think that Caligula had hyperthyroidism. This diagnosis is mainly attributed to Caligula's irritability and his "stare" as described by Pliny the Elder.

Burial site 

On 17 January 2011, police in Nemi, Italy, announced that they believed they had discovered the site of Caligula's burial, after arresting a thief caught smuggling a statue which they believed to be of the emperor. The claim has been met with scepticism by Cambridge historian Mary Beard.

Cultural depictions

In film and series 

 Welsh actor Emlyn Williams was cast as Caligula in the never-completed 1937 film I, Claudius.
 He was played by Ralph Bates in the 1968 ITV historical drama series, The Caesars.
 American actor Jay Robinson famously portrayed a sinister and scene-stealing Caligula in two epic films of the 1950s, The Robe (1953) and its sequel Demetrius and the Gladiators (1954).
 He was played by John Hurt in the 1976 BBC mini-series I, Claudius.
 A feature-length historical film Caligula was completed in 1979 with Malcolm McDowell in the lead role.
 He was portrayed by David Brandon in the 1982 historical exploitation film Caligula... The Untold Story.
 Caligula is a character in the 2015 NBC series A.D. The Bible Continues and is played by British actor Andrew Gower. His portrayal emphasises Caligula's "dabauched and dangerous" persona  as well as his sexual appetite, quick temper, and violent nature.
 The third season of the Roman Empire series (released on Netflix in 2019) is named Caligula: The Mad Emperor with South African actor Ido Drent in the leading role.
 In the award winning BBC show Horrible Histories he is portrayed by Simon Farnaby.

In literature and theatre 

 Caligula, by French author Albert Camus, is a play in which Caligula returns after deserting the palace for three days and three nights following the death of his beloved sister, Drusilla. The young emperor then uses his unfettered power to "bring the impossible into the realm of the likely".
 In the novel I, Claudius by English writer Robert Graves, Caligula is presented as a murderous sociopath from his childhood who became clinically insane early in his reign. In the novel, at the age of only ten, Caligula drove his father Germanicus to a state of despair and eventually death by secretly terrorizing him. Graves' Caligula commits incest with all three of his sisters and is implied to have murdered Drusilla. The novel was adapted for television in the 1976 BBC mini-series of the same name.
 Caligula appears as one of the antagonists in the popular young adult fiction novel series The Trials of Apollo. He is revealed as having become a minor god and has survived into modern times, along with two other Roman emperors, Commodus and Nero.

In opera 

A young Caligula appears as one of the characters in Heinrich Ignaz Franz Biber's opera Arminio.
Caligula is the main character in Detlev Glanert's opera Caligula, based on the Albert Camus play.
Different composers from the Baroque era appear to have composed operatic works about Caligula, but most of these have been lost.

See also 

 List of Roman emperors

References

Bibliography

Secondary sources

Primary sources

Cassius Dio, Roman History, Book 59.
 Josephus, Antiquities of the Jews, (trans. W.Whiston), Books XVIII–XIX.
 Philo of Alexandria, (trans. C.D.Yonge, London, H. G. Bohn, 1854–1890):
On the Embassy to Gaius
Flaccus
 Seneca the Younger
On Firmness
On Anger
To Marcia, On Consolation
On Tranquility of Mind
On the Shortness of Life
To Polybius, On Consolation
To Helvia, On Consolation
On Benefits
On the Terrors of Death (Epistle IV)
On Taking One's Own Life (Epistle LXXVII)
On the Value of Advice (Epistle XCIV)
Suetonius, The Lives of Twelve Caesars, Life of Caligula.
Tacitus, Annals, Book 6.

Further reading

External links 

The portrait of Caligula in the Digital Sculpture Project
Caligula Attempts to Conquer Britain in AD 40
Biography from De Imperatoribus Romanis
Franz Lidz, "Caligula's Garden of Delights, Unearthed and Restored", New York Times, Jan. 12, 2021

 
 

 
12 births
41 deaths
1st-century murdered monarchs
1st-century Roman emperors
Assassinated heads of state
Burials at the Mausoleum of Augustus
Capri, Campania
Children of Germanicus
Deaths by stabbing in Rome
Incest
Julii Caesares
Julio-Claudian dynasty
Murdered Roman emperors
People from Anzio
People with epilepsy
Politicide perpetrators
Roman emperors murdered by the Praetorian Guard
Roman quaestors
Royalty and nobility with disabilities
Roman emperors to suffer posthumous denigration or damnatio memoriae
Roman pharaohs